Carteret Leathes  (July 1698 – 1780), of Oakley House, near Harwich, Essex, was a British politician who sat in the House of Commons from1727 to 1747.

Early life
Leathes was born Mussenden, the eldest son of John Mussenden of  Hillsborough, County Down and his wife Jane Leathes, daughter of Adam Leathes. He matriculated at Wadham College, Oxford in 1717. He married Loveday Garrod, daughter of S. Garrod of Lincolnshire. In 1727, he succeeded his uncle William Leathes (resident at Brussels c.1718-24) and assumed name of Leathes 1727.

Political career
Leathes’ inheritance included an estate near Harwich, where he intended to stand at the 1727 British general election, but in the event was returned as  Member of Parliament for Sudbury. In 1733 he was described as ‘a friend to the Government, a sure one, and has not given a vote against us’. In  1733 Leathes applied to Walpole for the government interest at Harwich  for the next election, and Walpole agreed that this should go to Leathes and Lord Perceval, standing jointly. At the  1734 British general election,   Leathes  said he could not  persuade his supporters to go along with the compact, and he joined with  Charles Stanhope, against Perceval. Leathes became  Recorder of Harwich in 1734.

At the 1741 British general election  he  nominated his brother, Hill Mussenden, to replace him at Harwich,  and went back to Sudbury. He supported the Administration until  the end of 1743, when he and his brother voted with the Opposition on a motion to discontinue the service of the Hanoverians from British pay. They abstained from both the two subsequent divisions on the Hanoverians in 1744 and 1746. He lost control of Harwich at the  1747 British general election when his brother was replaced there by a government nominee.

Later life
Leathes never stood for election again, but continued to play a part in Harwich politics.

Leathes married Loveday Garrod. He died in 1780 leaving three sons and a daughter.

References

1698 births
1780 deaths
Members of the Parliament of Great Britain for English constituencies
British MPs 1727–1734
British MPs 1734–1741
British MPs 1741–1747